David Stewart Rathie (born 29 May 1951) is a former Australian sportsperson who represented the Wallabies in rugby union and played first-class cricket with both Queensland in the Sheffield Shield and Canterbury in the Shell Trophy.

Early life
Rathie was born in Roma, Queensland, and educated at the Anglican Church Grammar School.

Rugby union career
In 1970–71, Rathie toured France with the Australian rugby team but wasn't capped. An inside centre, he made his Test debut in a draw at the Sydney Cricket Ground on 17 June 1972, when Australia met France again, this time on home soil.  His partner in the centre, Dave Burnet, was also making his debut. A week later, Rathie was capped again in another close encounter, this time at Ballymore Stadium at his home city Brisbane which the Wallabies lost by a point.

An articled clerk by profession, Rathie moved to Sydney to work but was also capped three times for the New South Wales Waratahs in 1978.

Cricket career
Rathie made two appearances with Queensland in the 1970–71 Sheffield Shield season but didn't play at first-class level again for three years. 
Rathie played first-class cricket again in the 1979–80 season, playing six matches for Canterbury in New Zealand's Shell Trophy. He played once more for Queensland when he returned to Australia, against the touring Indian team in December 1980. Opening the batting, he was dismissed cheaply in both innings by Karsan Ghavri and Roger Binny respectively, but took a catch to dismiss Sunil Gavaskar.

References

External links
Cricinfo: David Rathie

1951 births
Australian rugby union players
Australia international rugby union players
Australian cricketers
Queensland cricketers
Canterbury cricketers
Living people
People educated at Anglican Church Grammar School
People from Roma, Queensland
Cricketers from Queensland
Rugby union players from Queensland
Rugby union centres